Ptuj is a town in northeastern Slovenia that is the seat of the Municipality of Ptuj. Ptuj, the oldest recorded city in Slovenia, has been inhabited since the late Stone Age and developed from a Roman military fort. Ptuj was located at a strategically important crossing of the Drava River, along a prehistoric trade route between the Baltic Sea and the Adriatic.  The area is part of the traditional region of Styria and it was part of the Austria-Hungarian Empire. In the early 20th century the majority of the residents spoke German, but today the population is largely Slovene. Residents of Ptuj are known as Ptujčani in Slovene.

History

Earliest history
Ptuj is the oldest recorded town in Slovenia. There is evidence that the area was settled in the Stone Age. In the Late Iron Age it was settled by Celts.

AD 69: Ptuj is mentioned for the first time
By the 1st century BC, the settlement was controlled by Ancient Rome as part of the Pannonian province. In 69 AD, Vespasian was elected Roman Emperor by the Danubian legions in Ptuj, and the first written mention of the city of Ptuj is from the same year. Poetovium was the base-camp of Legio XIII Gemina where it had its legionary fortress or castrum. The name originated in the times of Emperor Trajan, who granted the settlement city status and named it Colonia Ulpia Traiana Poetovio in 103. The patristic writer Victorinus was Bishop of Poetovio before his martyrdom in 303 or 304. The Caesar Constantius Gallus was divested of his imperial robe and arrested in Poetovio before his subsequent execution in Pola (354) (Amm.Marc. Hist. XIV) The battle of Poetovio in 388 saw Theodosius I's victory over the usurper, Maximus.

The city had 40,000 inhabitants until it was plundered by the Huns in 450.

Middle Ages
In 570 the city was occupied by Eurasian Avars and Slavic tribes. Ptuj became part of the Frankish Empire after the fall of Avar state at the end of 8th century. Between 840 and 874 it belonged to the Slavic Balaton Principality of Pribina and Kocelj. Between 874 and 890 Ptuj gradually came under the influence of the Archbishopric of Salzburg which had both spiritual and temporal rule over the town; city rights passed in 1376 began an economic upswing for the settlement.

Habsburg Monarchy and Austria-Hungary
After the re-establishment of the Habsburg rule in 1490, following Matthias Corvinus's conquests, the Archbishop of Salzburg was stripped of the remaining temporal authority over the town and the surrounding areas; Ptuj (known in German as Pettau) was officially incorporated into the Duchy of Styria in 1555.

Pettau was a battleground during the Ottoman wars in Europe and suffered from fires in 1684, 1705, 1710, and 1744. Its population and importance began to decline in the 19th century, however, after the completion of the Vienna-Trieste route of the Austrian Southern Railway, as the line went through Marburg (Maribor) instead.

According to the 1910 Austro-Hungarian census, 86% of the population of Pettau's Old Town was German-speaking, while the population of the surrounding villages predominantly spoke Slovenian. After the collapse of Austria-Hungary at the end of World War I, Pettau was included in the short-lived Republic of German Austria.

Establishment of Yugoslavia
After the military intervention of the Slovenian general Rudolf Maister, the entire territory of Lower Styria was included into the State of Slovenes, Croats and Serbs (Yugoslavia). During the interwar period, the number and the percentage of those identifying as Germans in the city, which was renamed Ptuj, decreased rapidly, although a relatively strong ethnic German minority remained.

World War II
After the invasion of Yugoslavia in April 1941, Ptuj was occupied by Nazi Germany. From 1941 to 1944 the town's Slovenian population was dispossessed and deported. Their homes were taken over by German speakers from South Tyrol and Gottschee County, who had themselves been evicted according to an agreement between Adolf Hitler and Benito Mussolini. These German immigrants, along with the native German Pettauer, were expelled to Austria in 1945; many later settled in North America.

Since 1945, Ptuj has been populated almost completely by Slovenes.

Culture

The Kurent or Korant Carnival
Ptuj is the center place of a ten-day-long carnival in the spring, an ancient Slavic pagan rite of spring and fertility, called Kurentovanje or Korantovanje. Kurent is believed to be the name of an ancient god of hedonism - the Slavic counterpart of the Greek god Priapos, although there are no written records.

Kurent or Korant is a figure dressed in sheep skin who go about the town wearing masks, a long red tongue, cow bells, and multi-colored ribbons on the head. The Kurent(s) from Ptuj and the adjoining villages also wear feathers, while those from the Haloze and Lancova Vas wear horns. Organized in groups, Kurents go through town, from house to house, making noise with their bells and wooden sticks, to symbolically scare off evil spirits and the winter.

Landmarks

The parish church in the settlement is dedicated to Saint George and belongs to the Roman Catholic Archdiocese of Maribor. It is a three-naved Gothic building from the 13th and early 14th century, but the structure incorporates parts of a much earlier structure, dating to the mid-9th century.

 Ptuj Castle
 St. George's Church
 Little Castle
 Ptuj Town Hall
 Ptuj Town Theatre
 Town Tower
 Dominican monastery
 Orpheus Monument
 Franciscan monastery
 Upper Mansion
 St. Oswald's Church

Town quarters

Center
Breg–Turnišče
Ljudski Vrt
Jezero
Panorama
Rogoznica
Grajena
Spuhlja

People

Victorinus of Pettau († 303), bishop, martyr
Luigi Kasimir (1881−1962), artist
Angela Salloker (1913−2006), actress
Brigita Brezovac, bodybuilder
Nastja Čeh, Slovenian international footballer
, geopolitical analyst and expert of international relations
Benka Pulko, long distance motorcycle traveler, writer, photographer, humanitarian and Guinness World Record Holder
Miha Remec, science fiction author
Aleš Šteger, poet
Dejan Zavec, boxer
Aljaž Skorjanec, dancer and choreographer
Tim Gajser, motocross racer

Sister cities 

Ptuj is twinned with:

Gallery

References

External links
 
ptuj.info (tourism)
 

 
Cities and towns in Styria (Slovenia)
Populated places in the City Municipality of Ptuj
Spa towns in Slovenia